Crossing Sewer is the name of two minor streams (brooks) of the Pevensey Levels in Hailsham, Wealden District of East Sussex, England. Both streams serve as drainage ditchs for several streams, many of which are unnamed.

Course 
It then turns southeast and flows into White Dyke Sewer, giving rise to Lewens Sewer. The single drainage ditch of Crossing Sewer then drains back into White Dyke Sewer, which itself is a tributary of Down Sewer.

References 

Rivers of East Sussex
Rivers of the Pevensey Levels